Christopher Zurawsky (born May 18, 1962) is a political candidate from Pittsburgh, Pennsylvania. In 2011 he ran for the 5th District seat of the Pittsburgh City Council, which includes Squirrel Hill, Greenfield, Hazelwood, Lincoln Place, Swisshelm Park, Regent Square, Glen Hazel, Hays, and New Homestead. He has received endorsements from the Pittsburgh 14th Ward Independent Democratic Club, Democracy For America, and the Gertrude Stein Club. These organizations serve to educate voters by endorsing progressive candidates who promote democracy and civil rights.

Zurawsky currently serves as the secretary of the 14th ward Independent Democratic Club, where he was formerly president. 
Moreover, he is serving his third term as a committee member of the Allegheny County Democratic Committee. Zurawsky has been involved in the democratic process in the East End of Pittsburgh, and through his service, he has been an advocate for Pittsburgh voters.

Zurawsky grew up in Brentwood, Pennsylvania, and graduated from St. Sylvester Grade School and Brentwood High School. He received his Bachelors in Journalism from the University of Pittsburgh, and he holds a Master of Science in Journalism from Columbia University and a Master of Science in Public Policy and Management from the University of Pittsburgh.

Zurawsky has worked as a journalist for the New Pittsburgh Courier, the McKeesport Daily News, The Philadelphia Inquirer, and the Pittsburgh Tribune-Review. He has taught Journalism at the University of Pittsburgh, Point Park University, and the University of Newcastle, Australia. Currently, Zurawsky is the Director of Communications and Public Affairs at the Association of American Cancer Institutes. In this position, Zurawsky helps cancer patients and their families throughout Pittsburgh by traveling to Capitol Hill to inform lawmakers about the life-saving work performed at cancer research centers like the University of Pittsburgh Cancer Institute’s Hillman Cancer Center.

Chris’ wife, Sarah Flanders, is a psychiatrist who grew up on Murray Avenue and is a Taylor Allderdice High School graduate. They have two sons, Nicholas, a graduate of the University of Pittsburgh, and Peter, a student at Ontario College of Art and Design. The family has owned a home in Squirrel Hill since 1999.

Chris is a member of St. Rosalia Parish, in Greenfield, as well as the Squirrel Hill Urban Coalition, the Pittsburgh History and Landmarks Foundation, Phipps Conservatory and Botanical Gardens, and the Rails-to-Trails Conservancy. He is also a board member of Home of Hope – U.S., a non-profit that works with the Salesian Sisters of Don Bosco, in southern India, to care for poor orphaned children.

References

External links 
 Zurawsky For Council
  Post Gazette Article - City Council Races Seen As Test of Mayor's Clout
  Chris Zurawsky's Facebook Page
  Vote Zurawsky! on Twitter

University of Pittsburgh alumni
University of Pittsburgh faculty
Politicians from Pittsburgh
1962 births
Living people
Point Park University faculty